Hiddenhausen-Schweicheln is a railway station located in Hiddenhausen, Germany. The station is located on the Bassum–Herford railway (which runs through the station next to the Hamm–Minden railway, which has no platforms here). The station was opened on 15 December 2002. The train services are operated by Eurobahn.

Train services
The following services currently call at Hiddenhausen-Schweicheln:
Wiehengebirgs-Bahn Bad Bentheim - Rheine - Osnabrück - Herford - Bielefeld

Notes 

Railway stations in North Rhine-Westphalia
Railway stations in Germany opened in 2002